The 1906 Carlisle Indians football team represented the Carlisle Indian Industrial School as an independent during the 1906 college football season. Led by Bemus Pierce in his first and only season as head coach, the Indians compiled a record of 9–3 and outscored opponents 244 to 40. Vanderbilt had one of the first big upsets from the south when it defeated Carlisle 4 to 0. 1906 was the first season with a legal forward pass.

Schedule

See also
 1906 College Football All-America Team

References

Carlisle
Carlisle Indians football seasons
Carlisle Indians football